Liga Deportiva Universitaria de Quito's 2003 season was the club's 73rd year of existence, the 50th year in professional football, and the 42nd in the top level of professional football in Ecuador.

Kits
Supplier: Umbro
Sponsor(s): Siemens Mobile, Coca-Cola, Almacenes Japón

Squad

Competitions

Serie A

First stage

Results

Second stage

Results

Liguilla Final

Results

Copa Sudamericana

Copa Sudamericana squad

First stage

Second stage

References
2003 season on RSSSF

External links
Official Site 
LDU Quito (2) - ESPOLI (2) 2nd goal
LDU Quito (2) - El Nacional (0) 1st goal
LDU Quito (4) - Deportivo Cuenca (1)
LDU Quito (6) - Aucas (2)
Deportivo Cuenca (1) - LDU Quito (3) 3rd goal
LDU Quito (2) - El Nacional (1) 1st goal

2003
Ldu